Sid Weiss (April 30, 1914 – March 30, 1994) was an American jazz double-bassist, active principally as a sideman for white jazz musicians in the 1930s and 1940s.

Early life
Weiss was born in Schenectady, New York, on April 30, 1914. "He played violin, clarinet, and tuba before changing to double bass in his teens."

Later life and career
Weiss started playing in New York around 1931, working that decade with Louis Prima, Bunny Berigan, Wingy Manone, Artie Shaw, Tommy Dorsey, Charlie Barnet, and Adrian Rollini. He was with Benny Goodman from 1941 to 1945, then played in the second half of the 1940s and the early 1950s with Muggsy Spanier, Pee Wee Russell, Cozy Cole, Bud Freeman, Duke Ellington, and Eddie Condon. He quit full-time performing after moving to Los Angeles in 1954. He died in San Bernardino County, California, on March 29, 1994.

References

External links
 Sid Weiss recordings at the Discography of American Historical Recordings.

1914 births
1994 deaths
American jazz double-bassists
Male double-bassists
American male jazz musicians
People from Schenectady, New York
20th-century American musicians
20th-century double-bassists
20th-century American male musicians
Jazz musicians from New York (state)